Gymnelus is a genus of small fish in the family Zoarcidae found in the Arctic Ocean, and adjacent parts of the North Pacific and North Atlantic. They are highly variable in color, which has resulted in the description of several taxa now considered invalid.

Species
There are currently eleven recognized species in this genus:

 Gymnelus andersoni Chernova, 1998
 Gymnelus diporus Chernova, 2000
 Gymnelus gracilis Chernova, 2000
 Gymnelus hemifasciatus Andriashev, 1937 (Halfbarred pout)
 Gymnelus obscurus Chernova, 2000
 Gymnelus pauciporus Anderson, 1982
 Gymnelus popovi 	(Taranetz & Andriashev, 1935) (Aleutian pout) – often in monotypic genus Commandorella
 Gymnelus retrodorsalis Le Danois, 1913 (Aurora unernak)
 Gymnelus soldatovi Chernova, 2000
 Gymnelus taeniatus Chernova, 1999
 Gymnelus viridis J. C. Fabricius, 1780 (Fish doctor)

Many of the above species described in this genus are regarded as  synonyms by some authorities (G. hemifasciatus with synonyms G. diporus, G. knipowitschi and G. soldatovi; G. retrodorsalis with synonyms G. andersoni, G. esipovi and G. taeniatus; and G. viridis with synonyms G. barsukovi, G. bilabrus, G. gracilis, G. obscurus and G. platycephalus).

References

Gymnelinae